The 2013 Houston Astros season was the team's first year as a member of the American League, with them switching from the National League Central division to the American League West.  This was also their 52nd season as an MLB franchise, their 49th as the Astros, and their 14th at Minute Maid Park. 

The Astros continued their exceptionally poor records from 2011 and 2012, winning only 51 games, the fewest by any Major League Baseball team since the 2004 Arizona Diamondbacks who finished with an identical record. Perhaps the lowest point of the season came when the Astros finished with a 15-game losing streak. Other lowlights included winning only 12 series (2 of which were sweeps, none outside of the AL West), getting swept 18 times, finishing 45 games out of first place, winning just 2 games against the rival Texas Rangers and 4 games against the Oakland Athletics, getting shut out 14 times (twice in a row against the Rangers and the Rays), and yielding 10 runs or more in 17 games.

Regular season

Season standings

American League West

American League Wild Card

Record vs. opponents

Game log 

|-  style="text-align:center; background:#cfc
| 1 || March 31 || Rangers || 8-2 || Norris (1-0) || Harrison (0-1) || Bédard (1)  || 41,307 || Minute Maid Park || 1-0 || W1
|-

|-  style="text-align:center; background:#fbb
| 2 || April 2 || Rangers || 0-7 || Darvish (1-0) || Harrell (0-1) ||   || 22,673 || Minute Maid Park || 1-1 ||L1
|-  style="text-align:center; background:#fbb
| 3 || April 3 || Rangers || 0-4 || Ogando (1-0) || Humber (0-1) ||   || 15,831 || Minute Maid Park || 1-2 || L2
|-  style="text-align:center; background:#fbb
| 4 || April 5 || Athletics || 3-8 || Straily (1-0) || Peacock (0-1) ||   || 18,197 || Minute Maid Park || 1-3 ||L3
|-  style="text-align:center; background:#fbb
| 5 || April 6 || Athletics || 3-6 || Colón (1-0) || Norris (1-1) || Balfour (1) || 18,685 || Minute Maid Park || 1-4 || L4
|-  style="text-align:center; background:#fbb
| 6 || April 7 || Athletics || 3-9 || Anderson (1-1) || Harrell (0-2) ||   || 16,914 || Minute Maid Park || 1-5 || L5
|-  style="text-align:center; background:#fbb
| 7 || April 8 || @ Mariners || 0-3 || Saunders (1-1) || Humber (0-2) || Wilhelmsen (3)  || 42,589 || Safeco Field || 1-6 ||L6
|-  style="text-align:center; background:#cfc
| 8 || April 9 || @ Mariners || 16-9 || Clemens (1-0) || Maurer (0-2) ||   || 10,745 || Safeco Field || 2-6 ||W1
|-  style="text-align:center; background:#cfc
| 9 || April 10 || @ Mariners || 8-3 ||Peacock (1-1) || Beavan (0-1) ||   || 10,493 || Safeco Field || 3-6 ||W2
|-  style="text-align:center; background:#cfc
| 10 || April 12 || @ Angels || 5-0 || Norris (2-1) || Hanson (1-1) ||   || 37,674 || Angel Stadium of Anaheim || 4-6 ||W3
|-  style="text-align:center; background:#fbb
| 11 || April 13 || @ Angels || 4-5 || Roth (1-0) || Veras (0-1) ||   ||  43,520 || Angel Stadium of Anaheim || 4-7 || L1
|-  style="text-align:center; background:#fbb
| 12 || April 14 || @ Angels || 1-4 || Wilson (1-0) || Humber (0-3) || Frieri (2)  || 36,126 || Angel Stadium of Anaheim || 4-8 ||L2
|-  style="text-align:center; background:#fbb
| 13 || April 15 || @ Athletics || 2-11 || Milone (3-0) || Bédard (0-1) ||   || 10,689 || O.co Coliseum || 4-9 ||L3
|-  style="text-align:center; background:#fbb
| 14 || April 16 || @ Athletics || 3-4 || Doolittle (1-0) || Cruz (0-1) || Balfour (2)  || 11,038 || O.co Coliseum || 4-10 ||L4
|-  style="text-align:center; background:#fbb
| 15 || April 17 || @ Athletics || 5-7 || Colón (2-0) || Norris (2-2) || Balfour (3)  || 15,488 || O.co Coliseum || 4-11 ||L5
|-  style="text-align:center; background:#cfc
| 16 || April 19 || Indians || 3-2 || Harrell (1-2) || Myers (0-3) || Veras (1)  || 17,241 || Minute Maid Park || 5-11 ||W1
|-  style="text-align:center; background:#fbb
| 17 || April 20 || Indians || 6-19 || Kluber (1-0) || Humber (0-4) ||   || 19,904 || Minute Maid Park || 5-12 || L1
|-  style="text-align:center; background:#fbb
| 18 || April 21 || Indians || 4-5 || Allen (1-0) || Ambriz (0-1) || Perez (2) || 22,005 || Minute Maid Park || 5-13 || L2
|-  style="text-align:center; background:#fbb
| 19 || April 22 || Mariners || 1-7 || Hernández (2-2) || Peacock (1-2) ||   || 23,201 || Minute Maid Park || 5-14 ||L3
|-  style="text-align:center; background:#cfc
| 20 || April 23 || Mariners || 3-2 || Norris (3-2) || Iwakuma (2-1) || Veras (2)  || 13,929 || Minute Maid Park || 6-14 ||W1
|-  style="text-align:center; background:#cfc
| 21 || April 24 || Mariners || 10-3 || Harrell (2-2) || Saunders (1-3) ||   || 11,686 || Minute Maid Park || 7-14 ||W2
|-  style="text-align:center; background:#fbb
| 22 || April 25 || @ Red Sox || 2-7 || Buchholz (5-0) || Humber (0-5) ||   || 30,093 || Fenway Park || 7-15 ||L1
|-  style="text-align:center; background:#fbb
| 23 || April 26 || @ Red Sox || 3-7 || Dempster (1-2) || Bédard (0-2) ||   || 29,312 || Fenway Park || 7-16 ||L2
|-  style="text-align:center; background:#fbb
| 24 || April 27 || @ Red Sox || 4-8 || Doubront (3-0) || Peacock (1-3) ||   || 34,726 || Fenway Park || 7-17 ||L3
|-  style="text-align:center; background:#fbb
| 25 || April 28 || @ Red Sox || 1-6 || Lackey (1-1) || Norris (3-3) ||   || 36,527 || Fenway Park || 7-18 ||L4
|-  style="text-align:center; background:#cfc
| 26 || April 29 || @ Yankees || 9-1 || Harrell (3-2) || Pettitte (3-2) ||   || 34,262 || Yankee Stadium ||  8-18||W1
|-  style="text-align:center; background:#fbb
| 27 || April 30 || @ Yankees || 4-7 || Kuroda (4-1) || Humber (0-6) || Rivera (10) ||  34,301|| Yankee Stadium || 8-19 ||L1
|-

|-  style="text-align:center; background:#fbb
| 28 || May 1 || @ Yankees || 4-5 || Logan (2-1) || Clemens (1-1) || Rivera (11)  || 34,117 || Yankee Stadium || 8-20 ||L2
|-  style="text-align:center; background:#fbb
| 29 || May 2 || Tigers || 3-7 || Putkonen (1-0) || Keuchel (0-1) ||   || 16,624 || Minute Maid Park || 8-21 ||L3
|-  style="text-align:center; background:#fbb
| 30 || May 3 || Tigers || 3-4 || Smyly (2-0) || Veras (0-2) || Valverde (3)  || 16,719 || Minute Maid Park || 8-22 ||L4
|-  style="text-align:center; background:#fbb
| 31 || May 4 || Tigers || 2-17 || Scherzer (4-0) || Harrell (3-3) ||   || 21,266 || Minute Maid Park || 8-23 ||L5
|-  style="text-align:center; background:#fbb
| 32 || May 5 || Tigers || 0-9 || Verlander (4-2) || Humber (0-7) ||   || 23,228 || Minute Maid Park || 8-24 ||L6
|-  style="text-align:center; background:#cfc
| 33 || May 7 || Angels || 7-6 || Lyles (1-0) || Wilson (3-1) || Veras (3)  || 15,266 || Minute Maid Park || 9-24 ||W1
|-  style="text-align:center; background:#cfc
| 34 || May 8 || Angels || 3-1 || Norris (4-3) || Blanton (0-6) || Veras (4)  || 12,906 || Minute Maid Park || 10-24 ||W2
|-  style="text-align:center; background:#fbb
| 35 || May 9 || Angels || 5-6 || Richards (2-3) || Ambriz (0-2) || Frieri (5) || 13,003 || Minute Maid Park || 10-25 ||L1
|-  style="text-align:center; background:#fbb
| 36 || May 10 || Rangers || 2-4 || Ross (1-0) || Wright (0-1) || Nathan (10) || 20,293 || Minute Maid Park || 10-26 ||L2
|-  style="text-align:center; background:#fbb
| 37 || May 11 || Rangers || 7-8 || Darvish (6-1) || Humber (0-8) || Nathan (11)  || 27,188 || Minute Maid Park || 10-27 ||L3
|-  style="text-align:center; background:#fbb
| 38 || May 12 || Rangers || 7-12 || Tepesch (3-3) || Lyles (1-1) ||   || 19,730 || Minute Maid Park || 10-28 ||L4
|-  style="text-align:center; background:#fbb
| 39 || May 13 || @ Tigers || 2-7 || Sánchez (4-3) || Norris (4-4) ||   || 31,161 || Comerica Park || 10-29 ||L5
|-  style="text-align:center; background:#fbb
| 40 || May 14 || @ Tigers || 2-6 || Fister (5-1) || Harrell (3-4) ||   || 34,542 || Comerica Park || 10-30 ||L6
|-  style="text-align:center; background:#cfc
| 41 || May 15 || @ Tigers || 7-5 || Ambriz (1-2) || Albuquerque (0-1) || Veras (5)  || 40,315 || Comerica Park || 11-30 ||W1
|-  style="text-align:center; background:#fbb
| 42 || May 17 || @ Pirates || 4-5 || Wilson (4-0) || González (0-1) ||   || 29,743 || PNC Park || 11-31 ||L1
|-  style="text-align:center; background:#cfc
| 43 || May 18 || @ Pirates || 4-2 (11) || Cisnero (1-0) || Bryan Morris (1-2) || Veras (6)  || 32,925 || PNC Park ||  12-31||W1
|-  style="text-align:center; background:#fbb
| 44 || May 19 || @ Pirates || 0-1 || Locke (4-1) || Harrell (3-5) || Grilli (17) || 28,471 || PNC Park || 12-32 ||L1
|-  style="text-align:center; background:#cfc
| 45 || May 20 || Royals || 6-5 || Keuchel (1-1) || Guthrie (5-2) || Veras (7)  || 12,989 || Minute Maid Park || 13-32 ||W1
|-  style="text-align:center; background:#fbb
| 46 || May 21 || Royals || 3-7 || Chen (3-0) || Clemens (1-2) ||  || 12,302 || Minute Maid Park || 13-33 || L1
|-  style="text-align:center; background:#cfc
| 47 || May 22 || Royals || 3-1 || Lyles (2-1) || Shields (2-5) || Veras (8) || 12,324 || Minute Maid Park || 14-33 ||W1
|-  style="text-align:center; background:#fbb
| 48 || May 24 || Athletics || 5-6 || Neshek (1-0) || Veras (0-3) || Balfour (10) || 15,907 || Minute Maid Park || 14-34 ||L1
|-  style="text-align:center; background:#fbb
| 49 || May 25 || Athletics || 5-11 || Griffin (5-3) || Harrell (3-6) ||   || 18,591 || Minute Maid Park || 14-35 ||L2
|-  style="text-align:center; background:#fbb
| 50 || May 26 || Athletics || 2-6 || Colón (5-2) || Keuchel (1-2) ||   || 19,366 || Minute Maid Park || 14-36 ||L3
|-  style="text-align:center; background:#cfc
| 51 || May 27 || Rockies || 3-2 (12) || Clemens (2-2) || López (1-2) ||  || 16,044 || Minute Maid Park || 15-36 ||W1
|-  style="text-align:center; background:#fbb
| 52 || May 28 || Rockies || 1-2 || Belisle (2-2) || Veras (0-4) || Betancourt (11) || 11,974 || Minute Maid Park || 15-37 ||L1
|-  style="text-align:center; background:#cfc
| 53 || May 29 || @ Rockies || 6-3 || Clemens (3-2) || Escalona (1-2) ||   || 26,881 || Coors Field || 16-37 ||W1
|-  style="text-align:center; background:#cfc
| 54 || May 30 || @ Rockies || 7-5 || Harrell (4-6) || Nicasio (4-2) || Ambriz (1) || 26,239 || Coors Field || 17-37 ||W2
|-  style="text-align:center; background:#cfc
| 55 || May 31 || @ Angels || 6-3 || Keuchel (2-2) || Hanson (2-2) || Veras (9) || 34,401 || Angel Stadium of Anaheim || 18-37 ||W3
|-

|-  style="text-align:center; background:#cfc
| 56 || June 1 || @ Angels || 2-0 || Norris (5-4) || Williams (4-2) || Veras (10)  || 40,087 || Angel Stadium of Anaheim || 19-37 ||W4
|-  style="text-align:center; background:#cfc
| 57 || June 2 || @ Angels || 5-4 || Lyles (3-1) || Wilson (4-4) || Ambriz (2) || 35,515 || Angel Stadium of Anaheim || 20-37 ||W5
|-  style="text-align:center; background:#cfc
| 58 || June 3 || @ Angels || 2-1 || Bédard (1-2) || Blanton (1-9) || Veras (11) || 30,010 || Angel Stadium of Anaheim || 21-37 ||W6
|-  style="text-align:center; background:#fbb
| 59 || June 4 || Orioles || 1-4 || Tillman (5-2) || Harrell (4-7) || Johnson (19) || 15,920 || Minute Maid Park || 21-38 ||L1
|-  style="text-align:center; background:#cfc
| 60 || June 5 || Orioles || 11-7 || Keuchel (3-2) || García (2-3) ||   || 15,526 || Minute Maid Park || 22-38 ||W1
|-  style="text-align:center; background:#fbb
| 61 || June 6 || Orioles || 1-3 || González (3-2) || Norris (5-5) || Johnson (20) || 14,664 || Minute Maid Park || 22-39 ||L1
|-  style="text-align:center; background:#fbb
| 62 || June 7 || @ Royals || 2-4 || Herrera (3-4) || Wright (0-2) || Holland (11) || 24,808 || Kauffman Stadium || 22-40 ||L2
|-  style="text-align:center; background:#fbb
| 63 || June 8 || @ Royals || 2-7 || Santana (4-5) || Bédard (1-3) ||  || 28,055 || Kauffman Stadium || 22-41 ||L3
|-  style="text-align:center; background:#fbb
| 64 || June 9 || @ Royals || 0-2 || Crow (2-1) || Ambriz (1-3) || Holland (12) || 20,723 || Kauffman Stadium || 22-42 ||L4
|-  style="text-align:center; background:#fbb
| 65 || June 10 || @ Mariners || 2-3 || Iwakuma (7-1) || Keuchel (3-3) || Wilhelmsen (16) || 12,811 || Safeco Field || 22-43 ||L5
|-  style="text-align:center; background:#fbb
| 66 || June 11 || @ Mariners || 0-4 || Harang (3-6) || Norris (5-6) ||  || 10,266 || Safeco Field || 22-44 ||L6
|-  style="text-align:center; background:#cfc
| 67 || June 12 || @ Mariners || 6-1 || Clemens (4-2) || Wilehlmsen (0-2) ||   || 13,823 || Safeco Field || 23-44 ||W1
|-  style="text-align:center; background:#cfc
| 68 || June 14 || White Sox || 2-1 || Bédard (2-3) || Sale (5-5) || Veras (12) || 20,496 || Minute Maid Park || 24-44 ||W2
|-  style="text-align:center; background:#cfc
| 69 || June 15 || White Sox || 4-3 || Harrell (5-7) || Danks (1-3) || Veras (13) || 21,549 || Minute Maid Park || 25-44 ||W3
|-  style="text-align:center; background:#cfc
| 70 || June 16 || White Sox || 5-4 || Keuchel (4-3) || Santiago (2-5) || Veras (14) || 25,829 || Minute Maid Park || 26-44 ||W4
|-  style="text-align:center; background:#fbb
| 71 || June 17 || White Sox || 2-4 || Jones (3-4) || Norris (5-7) || Reed (20)  || 13,870 || Minute Maid Park || 26-45 ||L1
|-  style="text-align:center; background:#cfc
| 72 || June 18 || Brewers || 10-1 || Lyles (4-1) || Figaro (1-1) ||   || 13,330 || Minute Maid Park || 27-45 ||W1
|-  style="text-align:center; background:#fbb
| 73 || June 19 || Brewers || 1-3 || Axford (3-3) || Ambriz (1-4) || Rodriguez (5)  || 15,866 || Minute Maid Park || 27-46 ||L1
|-  style="text-align:center; background:#cfc
| 74 || June 20 || Brewers || 7-4 (10) || Ambriz (2-4) || Gonzalez (0-3) ||   || 17,803 || Minute Maid Park || 28-46 ||W1
|-  style="text-align:center; background:#fbb
| 75 || June 21 || @ Cubs || 1-3 || Garza (2-1) || Keuchel (4-4) || Gregg (11) || 33,119 || Wrigley Field || 28-47 ||L1
|-  style="text-align:center; background:#cfc
| 76 || June 22 || @ Cubs || 4-3 || Cisnero (2-0) || Gregg (2-1) || Veras (15) || 38,870 || Wrigley Field || 29-47 ||W1
|-  style="text-align:center; background:#fbb
| 77 || June 23 || @ Cubs || 6-14 || Samardzija (5-7) || Lyles (4-2) ||  || 35,121 || Wrigley Field || 29-48 ||L1
|-  style="text-align:center; background:#fbb
| 78 || June 25 || Cardinals || 5-13 || Westbrook (4-2) || Harrell (5-8) ||  || 19,271 || Minute Maid Park || 29-49 ||L2
|-  style="text-align:center; background:#cfc
| 79 || June 26 || Cardinals || 4-3 || Bédard (3-3) || Lynn (10-2) || Veras (16) || 17,428 || Minute Maid Park || 30-49 ||W1
|-  style="text-align:center; background:#fbb
| 80 || June 28 || Angels || 2-4 || De La Rosa (3-1) || Clemens || Frieri (20) || 20,498 || Minute Maid Park || 30-50 ||L1
|-  style="text-align:center; background:#fbb
| 81 || June 29 || Angels || 2-7 || Blanton || Lyles (4-3) ||   || 26,650 || Minute Maid Park || 30-51 ||L2
|-  style="text-align:center; background:#fbb
| 82 || June 30 || Angels || 1-3 || Wilson (8-5) || Cisnero (2-1) || Ernesto Frieri (21) || 22,361 || Minute Maid Park || 30-52 ||L3
|-

|-  style="text-align:center; background:#fbb
| 83 || July 1 || Rays || 0-12 || Moore (11-3) || Keuchel (4-5) ||   || 12,722 || Minute Maid Park || 30-53 ||L4
|-  style="text-align:center; background:#fbb
| 84 || July 2 || Rays || 0-8 || Price (2-4) || Bédard (3-4) ||   || 19,631 || Minute Maid Park || 30-54 ||L5
|-  style="text-align:center; background:#cfc
| 85 || July 3 || Rays || 4-1 || Norris (6-7) || Hernández (4-10) || Veras (17) || 14,143 || Minute Maid Park || 31-54 ||W1
|-  style="text-align:center; background:#fbb
| 86 || July 4 || Rays || 5-7 (11)|| Wright (2-1) || Fields (0-1) || Rodney (18) || 20,470 || Minute Maid Park || 31-55 ||L1
|-  style="text-align:center; background:#fbb
| 87 || July 5 || @ Rangers || 5-10 || Tepesch (4-6) || Harrell (5-9) ||   || 44,232 || Rangers Ballpark in Arlington || 31-56 ||L2
|-  style="text-align:center; background:#cfc
| 88 || July 6 || @ Rangers || 9-5 || Blackley (1-0) || Darvish (8-4) ||   || 44,272 || Rangers Ballpark in Arlington || 32-56 ||W1
|-  style="text-align:center; background:#fbb
| 89 || July 7 || @ Rangers || 4-5 || Burns (1-0) || Bédard (3-5) || Nathan (29) || 36,746 || Rangers Ballpark in Arlington || 32-57 ||L1
|-  style="text-align:center; background:#fbb
| 90 || July 9 || @ Cardinals || 5-9 || Wainwright (12-5) || Norris (6-8) || Mujica (24) || 43,836 || Busch Stadium || 32-58 || L2
|-  style="text-align:center; background:#fbb
| 91 || July 10 || @ Cardinals || 4-5 || Maness (5-1) || Wright (0-3) || Mujica (25)  || 44,313 || Busch Stadium || 32-59 ||L3
|-  style="text-align:center; background:#cfc
| 92 || July 12 || @ Rays || 2-1 || Cosart (1-0) || Price (3-5) || Veras (18) || 13,347 || Tropicana Field || 33-59 ||W1
|-  style="text-align:center; background:#fbb
| 93 || July 13 || @ Rays || 3-4 || Hernández (5-10) || Harrell (5-10) || Rodney (22) || 20,409 || Tropicana Field || 33-60 ||L1
|-  style="text-align:center; background:#fbb
| 94 || July 14 || @ Rays || 0-5 || Archer (4-3) || Bédard (3-6) ||   || 21,180 || Tropicana Field || 33-61 ||L2
|-  style="text-align:center; background:#fbb
| 95 || July 19 || Mariners || 7-10 || Saunders (9-8) || Norris (6-9) || Wilhelmsen (20) || 24,635 || Minute Maid Park || 33-62 ||L3
|-  style="text-align:center; background:#fbb
| 96 || July 20 || Mariners || 2-4 || Iwakuma (9-4) || Bédard (3-7) || Wilhelmsen (21) || 25,733 || Minute Maid Park || 33-63 ||L4
|-  style="text-align:center; background:#fbb
| 97 || July 21 || Mariners || 5-12 || Hernández (11-4) || Lyles (4-4) ||   || 38,838 || Minute Maid Park || 33-64 ||L5
|-  style="text-align:center; background:#fbb
| 98 || July 22 || Athletics || 3-4 || Cook (3-2) || Wright (0-4) || Balfour (26) || 16,381 || Minute Maid Park || 33-65 ||L6
|-  style="text-align:center; background:#cfc
| 99 || July 23 || Athletics || 5-4 || Fields (1-1) || Balfour (0-2) ||   || 32,249 || Minute Maid Park || 34-65 ||W1
|-  style="text-align:center; background:#fbb
| 100 || July 24 || Athletics || 3-4 || Griffin (9-7) || Blackley (1-1) || Cook (2)  || 24,831 || Minute Maid Park || 34-66 ||L1
|-  style="text-align:center; background:#fbb
| 101 || July 25 || @ Blue Jays || 0-4 || Buehrle (6-7) || Bédard (3-8) ||   || 24,188 || Rogers Centre || 34-67 ||L2
|-  style="text-align:center; background:#fbb
| 102 || July 26 || @ Blue Jays || 6-12 || Cecil (4-1) || Clemens (4-4) ||   || 24,088 || Rogers Centre || 34-68 ||L3
|-  style="text-align:center; background:#cfc
| 103 || July 27 || @ Blue Jays || 8-6 || Keuchel (5-5) || Johnson (1-7) || Veras (19) || 34,317 || Rogers Centre || 35-68 ||W1
|-  style="text-align:center; background:#fbb
| 104 || July 28 || @ Blue Jays || 1-2 || Janssen (3-0) || Cisnero (2-2) ||   || 31,634 || Rogers Centre || 35-69 ||L1
|-  style="text-align:center; background:#fbb
| 105 || July 30 || @ Orioles || 3-4 || Wei-Yin Chen (6-3) || Harrell (5-11) || Jim Johnson (36) || 24,904 || Oriole Park at Camden Yards || 35-70 || L2
|-  style="text-align:center; background:#cfc
| 106 || July 31 || @ Orioles || 11–0 || Oberholtzer (1–0) || González (8–5) ||  || 25,265  || Oriole Park at Camden Yards || 36-70 || W1
|-

|-  style="text-align:center; background:#fbb
| 107 || August 1 || @ Orioles || 3-6 || Norris (6-9) || Lyles (4-5) || Johnson (37) || 17,909 || Oriole Park at Camden Yards || 36-71 || L1
|-  style="text-align:center; background:#fbb
| 108 || August 2 || @ Twins || 3-4(13) || Pressly (3-2) || Keuchel (5-6) ||   || 30,633 || Target Field || 36-72 ||L2
|-  style="text-align:center; background:#fbb
| 109 || August 3 || @ Twins || 4-6 || Duensing (4-1) || Harrell (5-12) || Perkins (26)  || 38,078 || Target Field || 36-73 ||L3
|-  style="text-align:center; background:#fbb
| 110 || August 4 || @ Twins || 2-3 || Thielbar (2-1) || Peacock (1-4) || Perkins (27) || 34,780 || Target Field || 36-74 ||L4
|-  style="text-align:center; background:#cfc
| 111 || August 5 || Red Sox || 2-0 || Oberholtzer (2-0) || Lackey (7-9) || Fields (1) || 24,453 ||Minute Maid Park  || 37-74 ||W1
|-  style="text-align:center; background:#fbb
| 112 || August 6 || Red Sox || 10-15 || Workman (2-1) || Lyles (4-6) ||   || 21,620 || Minute Maid Park || 37-75 ||L1
|-  style="text-align:center; background:#fbb
| 113 || August 7 || Red Sox || 5-7 || Tazawa (5-3) || Fields (1-2) || Uehara (11) || 22,205 || Minute Maid Park || 37-76 ||L2
|-  style="text-align:center; background:#fbb
| 114 || August 9 || Rangers || 5-9 || Garza (8-2) || Zeid (0-1) || Cotts (1) || 23,673 || Minute Maid Park || 37-77 ||L3
|-  style="text-align:center; background:#fbb
| 115 || August 10 || Rangers || 4-5 || Frasor (3-2) || Harrell (5-13) || Nathan (34) || 33,322 || Minute Maid Park || 37-78 ||L4
|-  style="text-align:center; background:#fbb
| 116 || August 11 || Rangers || 1-6 || Perez (5-3) || Keuchel (5-7) ||   || 22,922 || Minute Maid Park || 37-79 ||L5
|-  style="text-align:center; background:#fbb
| 117 || August 12 || Rangers || 1-2 || Darvish (12-5) || Oberholtzer (2-1) || Nathan (35) || 18,712 || Minute Maid Park || 37-80 ||L6
|-  style="text-align:center; background:#cfc
| 118 || August 13 || @ Athletics || 5-4 || Lyles (5-6) || Colón (14-5) || Lo (1)  || 14,261 || O.co Coliseum || 38-80 ||W1
|-  style="text-align:center; background:#cfc
| 119 || August 14 || @ Athletics || 2-1 (11) || Harrell (6-13) || Doolittle (3-4) || Fields (2) || 18,278 || O.co Coliseum || 39-80 ||W2
|-  style="text-align:center; background:#fbb
| 120 || August 15 || @ Athletics || 0-5 || Gray (1-1) || Bédard (3-9) ||   || 16,487 || O.co Coliseum || 39-81 ||L1
|-  style="text-align:center; background:#cfc
| 121 || August 16 || @ Angels || 8-2 || Peacock (2-4) || Williams (5-9) ||   || 39,074 || Angel Stadium of Anaheim || 40-81 ||W1
|-  style="text-align:center; background:#fbb
| 122 || August 17 || @ Angels || 5-6 (10) || Frieri (1-4) || Fields (1-3) ||   || 40,246 || Angel Stadium of Anaheim || 40-82 ||L1
|-  style="text-align:center; background:#cfc
| 123 || August 18 || @ Angels || 7-5 || Oberholtzer (3-1) || Gutierrez (0-4) || Chapman (1) || 36,896 || Angel Stadium of Anaheim || 41-82 ||W1
|-  style="text-align:center; background:#fbb
| 124 || August 19 || @ Rangers || 5-16 || Garza (9-2) || Harrell (6-14) ||   || 32,113 || Rangers Ballpark in Arlington || 41-83 ||L1
|-  style="text-align:center; background:#fbb
| 125 || August 20 || @ Rangers || 2-4 || Cotts (5-2) || Cosart (1-1) || Nathan (37) || 39,009 || Rangers Ballpark in Arlington || 41-84 ||L2
|-  style="text-align:center; background:#fbb
| 126 || August 21 || @ Rangers || 4-5 || Nathan (4-2) || Lo (0-1) ||   || 38,699 || Rangers Ballpark in Arlington || 41-85 ||L3
|-  style="text-align:center; background:#cfc
| 127 || August 23 || Blue Jays || 12-4 || Lyles (6-6) || Redmond (1-2) ||   || 21,186 || Minute Maid Park || 42-85 ||W1
|-  style="text-align:center; background:#cfc
| 128 || August 24 || Blue Jays || 8-5 || Peacock (3-4) || Wang (1-2) || Lo (2) || 26,312 || Minute Maid Park || 43-85 ||W2
|-  style="text-align:center; background:#fbb
| 129 || August 25 || Blue Jays || 1-2 || Buehrle (10-7) || Lo (0-2) || Janssen (23) || 21,407 || Minute Maid Park || 43-86 ||L1
|-  style="text-align:center; background:#cfc
| 130 || August 26 || @ White Sox || 10-8 || Martínez (1-0) || Reed (5-2) || Lyles (1) || 13,404 || U.S. Cellular Field || 44-86 ||W1
|-  style="text-align:center; background:#fbb
| 131 || August 27 || @ White Sox || 3-4 || Veal (2-3) || Bédard (3-10) || Reed (36) || 15,491 || U.S. Cellular Field || 44-87 ||L1
|-  style="text-align:center; background:#fbb
| 132 || August 28 || @ White Sox || 1-6 || Sale (10-12) || Harrell (6-15) ||   || 15,961 || U.S. Cellular Field || 44-88 ||L2
|-  style="text-align:center; background:#fbb
| 133 || August 29 || Mariners || 2-3 || Ramirez (5-1) || Lyles (6-7) || Farquhar (10) || 22,203 || Minute Maid Park || 44-89 ||L3
|-  style="text-align:center; background:#fbb
| 134 || August 30 || Mariners || 1-7 || Walker (1-0) || Peacock (3-5) ||   || 13,869 || Minute Maid Park || 44-90 ||L4
|-  style="text-align:center; background:#fbb
| 135 || August 31 || Mariners || 1-3 || Saunders (11-13) || Keuchel (5-8) || Farquhar (11) || 21,085 || Minute Maid Park || 44-91 ||L5
|-

|-  style="text-align:center; background:#cfc
| 136 || September 1 || Mariners || 2-0 || Oberholtzer (4-1) || Furbush (2-5) ||   || 17,203 || Minute Maid Park || 45-91 ||W1
|-  style="text-align:center; background:#fbb
| 137 || September 2 || Twins || 6-10 || Roenicke (3-1) || Lo (0-3) ||  || 14,287 || Minute Maid Park || 45-92 ||L1
|-  style="text-align:center; background:#fbb
| 138 || September 3 || Twins || 6-9 || Thielbar (3-1) || Chapman (0-1) || Roenicke (1) || 13,500 || Minute Maid Park || 45-93 ||L2
|-  style="text-align:center; background:#cfc
| 139 || September 4 || Twins || 6-5 || Bédard (4-10) || Duensing (6-2) ||  || 14,869 || Minute Maid Park || 46-93 ||W1
|-  style="text-align:center; background:#cfc
| 140 || September 5 || @ Athletics || 3-2 || Peacock (4-5) || Gray (2-3) || Fields (3) || 11,569 || O.co Coliseum || 47-93 ||W2
|-  style="text-align:center; background:#fbb
| 141 || September 6 || @ Athletics || 5-7 || Griffin (13-9) || Keuchel (5-9) || Balfour (37) || 15,502 || O.co Coliseum || 47-94 ||L1
|-  style="text-align:center; background:#fbb
| 142 || September 7 || @ Athletics || 1-2 ||Straily (9-7)  ||Oberholtzer (4-2)  ||Doolittle (1)   ||17,310  || O.co Coliseum || 47-95 ||L2
|-  style="text-align:center; background:#fbb
| 143 || September 8 || @ Athletics || 2-7 ||Colón (15-6)  ||Harrell (6-16)  ||Anderson (3)   || 18,824 || O.co Coliseum || 47-96 ||L3
|-  style="text-align:center; background:#cfc
| 144 || September 9 || @ Mariners || 6-4 ||Chapman (1-1)  ||Farquhar (0-3)  ||Fields (4)   ||9,808  || Safeco Field || 48-96 ||W1
|-  style="text-align:center; background:#cfc
| 145 || September 10 || @ Mariners || 13-2 ||Lyles (7-7)  ||Saunders (11-14)  ||   ||10,245  || Safeco Field || 49-96 ||W2
|-  style="text-align:center; background:#cfc
| 146 || September 11 || @ Mariners || 6-1 ||Peacock (5-5)  ||Maurer (4-8)  ||Zeid (1)   ||11,656  || Safeco Field || 50-96 ||W3
|-  style="text-align:center; background:#cfc
| 147 || September 13 || Angels || 9-7 ||Keuchel (6-9)  ||Vargas  ||Fields (5)    ||19,742  || Minute Maid Park || 51-96 ||W4
|-  style="text-align:center; background:#fbb
| 148 || September 14 || Angels || 2-6 ||Weaver (10-8)  ||Oberholtzer (4-3)  ||  ||21,903  || Minute Maid Park || 51-97 ||L1
|-  style="text-align:center; background:#fbb
| 149 || September 15 || Angels || 1-2 ||Williams (8-10)  ||Clemens (4-5)  ||Frieri (34)   ||21,374  || Minute Maid Park || 51-98 ||L2
|-  style="text-align:center; background:#fbb
| 150 || September 16 || Reds || 1-6 ||Cueto (5-2)  ||Bédard (4-11)  ||   ||15,449  || Minute Maid Park || 51-99 ||L3
|-  style="text-align:center; background:#fbb
| 151 || September 17 || Reds || 0-10 ||Leake (14-6)  ||Lyles (7-8)  ||   ||25,582  || Minute Maid Park || 51-100 ||L4
|-  style="text-align:center; background:#fbb
| 152 || September 18 || Reds || 5-6 (13) ||Simón (6-4)  ||De León (0-1)  ||Chapman (37)   || 29,701 || Minute Maid Park || 51-101 ||L5
|-  style="text-align:center; background:#fbb
| 153 || September 19 || @ Indians || 1-2 ||Shaw (5-3)  ||Cruz (0-2)  ||   || 12,607 || Progressive Field || 51-102 ||L6
|-  style="text-align:center; background:#fbb
| 154 || September 20 || @ Indians || 1-2 (7) ||McAllister (9-9)  ||Oberholtzer (4-4)  ||Shaw (1)   ||17,310  || Progressive Field || 51-103 ||L7
|-  style="text-align:center; background:#fbb
| 155 || September 21 || @ Indians || 1-4 ||Kazmir (9-9)  ||Clemens (4-6)  ||   ||26,611  || Progressive Field || 51-104 ||L8
|-  style="text-align:center; background:#fbb
| 156 || September 22 || @ Indians || 2-9 ||Kluber (10-5)  ||Bédard (4-12)  ||   ||26,168  || Progressive Field || 51-105 ||L9
|-  style="text-align:center; background:#fbb
| 157 || September 23 || @ Rangers || 0-12 ||Holland (10-9)  ||Lyles (7-9)  ||   ||33,743  || Rangers Ballpark in Arlington ||51-106  ||L10
|- style="text-align:center; background:#fbb
| 158 || September 24 || @ Rangers || 2-3 ||Cotts (6-3)  ||Peacock (5-6)  ||Nathan (41)   ||42,267  || Rangers Ballpark in Arlington ||51-107  ||L11
|-  style="text-align:center; background:#fbb
| 159 || September 25 || @ Rangers || 3-7 ||Pérez (10-5)  ||Keuchel (6-10)  ||   ||43,207  || Rangers Ballpark in Arlington ||51-108  ||L12
|-  style="text-align:center; background:#fbb
| 160 || September 27 || Yankees || 2-3 ||Warren (3-2)  ||Oberholtzer (4-5)  ||Robertson (3)   ||29,486 || Minute Maid Park ||51-109  ||L13
|- style="text-align:center; background:#fbb
| 161 || September 28 || Yankees || 1-2 ||Pettitte (11-11)  ||Clemens (4-7)  ||   ||37,199  || Minute Maid Park ||51-110  ||L14
|-  style="text-align:center; background:#fbb
| 162 || September 29 || Yankees || 1-5 (14) ||Daley (1-0)  ||Harrell' (6-17)  ||   ||40,542  || Minute Maid Park ||51-111  ||L15
|-

Roster

Player stats

Batting

PitchingNote: W = Wins; L = Losses; ERA = Earned run average; G = Games pitched; GS = Games started; SV = Saves; IP = Innings pitched; H = Hits allowed; R = Runs allowed; ER = Earned runs allowed; HR = Home runs allowed; BB = Walks allowed;  SO = Strikeouts Television coverage
Astros games were televised on the Comcast SportsNet Houston network in 2013. The network broadcasts to about 40% of the households in the Houston area. Writer J. J. Cooper said that a game in September received a 0.0 rating, as "the Nielsen company could not statistically prove that anyone in the Houston market actually watched the game."

Farm system

LEAGUE CHAMPIONS: Quad Cities, Tri-City

References

External links

2013 Houston Astros season official site 
2013 Houston Astros season at Baseball Reference''

Houston Astros seasons
Houston Astros
2013 in sports in Texas